A pantechnicon van was originally a furniture removal van drawn by horses and used by the British company "The Pantechnicon" for delivering and collecting furniture which its customers wished to store. The name is a word largely of British English usage.

Origins and building

The word "Pantechnicon" is an invented one, formed from the Greek pan ("all") and techne ("art"). It was originally the name of a large establishment in Motcomb Street, Belgravia, London, opened in May 1831. It combined a picture gallery, a furniture shop, and the sale of carriages, while its southern half was a sizable warehouse for storing furniture and other items. Seth Smith, whose family were originally from Wiltshire, was a builder/property developer in the early 19th century, and constructed much of the new housing in Belgravia, then a country area.  Their clients required storage facilities and this was built on an awkward left-over triangular site with a Greek style Doric column façade, and called Pantechnicon, pseudo-Greek for "pertaining to all the arts or crafts".

Subsequently, special wagons were designed with sloping ramps to more easily load furniture, with the building name on the side. The very large, distinctive, and noticeable horse-drawn vans that were used to collect and deliver the customers' furniture came to be known as "Pantechnicon vans." From around 1900, the name was shortened to simply Pantechnicon. The Pantechnicon Ltd, a furniture storage and removal company, continued to trade until the 1970s.

The building was largely destroyed by fire in 1874, but the façade still exists and the usefulness of the vans was by then well established and they had been adopted by other firms. In 2015, the façade and the building behind was leased by its owner, Grosvenor Estates, to Cubitt House, a company specializing in pubs and restaurants in the Belgravia area, and has been redeveloped into a "food and retail emporium" over six floors, including a basement and a roof-terrace.

Design

Though small by modern standards, the vans were impressively large by those of their own time. The roof was a segment of a cylinder  higher in the middle than at the edges to ensure ready drainage but it had boards round the edges to allow stowage of extra items. Below the roof-line the body was a cuboid box except that behind the space required by the front wheels when turning tightly, the floor was lowered to permit greater internal headroom. This was achieved by cranking the back axle downwards as in a float, an idea first employed by a Mr Purdy. The lowered floor also saved some of the lifting which was a feature of using normal horse-drawn lorries and vans, which needed a deck high enough to fit the steering mechanism below it. Access was obtained through hinged doors at the rear. Outside these, the tailboard was hinged upwards from the level of the well.

Use
Some pantechnicons were drawn by two horses in tandem. This seems to have been so as to allow entry to relatively narrow town lanes and such places as the warehouse doorways. To give the driver a clear view of obstructions and to enable him to control the lead horse, he was usually seated on the front of the roof. When horses were replaced by traction engines the vans gained a new lease of life, being easily adapted to the new form of traction.

From the early 1900s onward lift-off container bodies were introduced which could be lifted off the chassis and transferred to a rail wagon or to the hold of a ship.

The value of these vans seems to have been quite quickly appreciated so that removal firms other than The Pantechnicon operated them, sometimes over long distances between towns, a business which was eventually superseded by the spread of the railways.

Popular culture

Charles Dickens mentions the Pantechnicon as a place to buy carriages in Pictures from Italy and The Uncommercial Traveler.

William Makepeace Thackeray's Vanity Fair (1848) mentions the Pantechnicon as a storage service:

The house was dismantled; the rich furniture and effects, the awful chandeliers and dreary blank mirrors packed away and hidden, the rich rosewood drawing-room suite was muffled in straw, the carpets were rolled up and corded, the small select library of well-bound books was stowed into two wine-chests, and the whole paraphernalia rolled away in several enormous vans to the Pantechnicon, where they were to lie until Georgy's majority.

An adventure with a runaway pantechnicon is one of the episodes in the Arnold Bennett novel, The Card (1911).

M.R. James mentions the fire that partially destroyed the Pantechnicon in his ghost story Count Magnus, as having probably destroyed some of his main character's papers.

H.G. Wells mentions the Pantechnicon as a concert venue in Star Begotten (1937).

E.F. Benson mentions the Pantechnicon in his short story The Male Impersonator: “As she skirted along one side of this square, which led into Curfew Street, she saw a large pantechnicon van lumbering along its cobbled way.” (1929)

Ken Follett's novel, Winter of the World mentions a pantechnicon being used by Daisy Peshkov Fitzherbert's servants to deliver her belongings.

Modern usage
A pantech truck or van is a word derivation of "pantechnicon" commonly currently used in Australia.  A pantech is a truck or van with a freight hull made of (or converted to) hard panels. Such vehicles can be used for chilled freight, or as removal vans.

References

Course, E. London Railways (1962)
Oxford English Dictionary. 
Definition of Pantechnicon

Animal-powered vehicles
History of transport in London
Road transport in London
Vans
Wagons
Warehouses